Mollaisalar is a village and municipality in the Barda Rayon of Azerbaijan.  It has a population of 719.

References

Populated places in Barda District